Erland Philip Peter Van Lidth De Jeude (June 3, 1953 – September 23, 1987) was a Dutch-American actor, opera singer, and amateur wrestler.

Early life and education
Van Lidth De Jeude was born in Hilversum, the Netherlands, and came to the United States with his family in 1958, where they resided in Orange, New Jersey (until 1960), then Stamford, Connecticut (1960–1962), Ridgefield, Connecticut (1962–1970) where he attended Ridgefield High School, and moved to Mont Vernon, New Hampshire in 1970 where he attended Milford Area Senior High School, from which he was graduated in 1972. He appeared in theatrical productions, and played center and nose guard on the varsity football team. He attended Massachusetts Institute of Technology where he studied computer science and was graduated with a B.S. in Computer Science & Electrical Engineering in 1977. He also distinguished himself on the wrestling team, where he was the 1976 NCAA Division III runner-up in the heavyweight division, and in stage productions, the most successful of which was A Funny Thing Happened on the Way to the Forum, in which he played Miles Gloriosus.

Career
After graduation he worked in Manhattan as a computer professional, while also attending the 1976 Summer Olympics in Montreal as an alternate in the heavyweight wrestling team. His preparation for the 1980 Olympics in Moscow was cut short when the United States boycotted the event. He also won the Bronze Medal in the international competition held in Tehran in 1978.

The 6'6" (198 cm), 340-pound (154 kg) wrestler was spotted in the New York Athletic Club by a casting director, which led to his role as the fearsome "Terror", leader of the Fordham Baldies, in the 1979 Philip Kaufman film The Wanderers. He continued to juggle his careers in film and information technology while also singing frequently with the Amato Opera in New York, studying to become a Heldenbaritone, and teaching computer programming at Manhattan Community College.  He is perhaps best known for his role as Grossberger in Stir Crazy with Richard Pryor and Gene Wilder, which was released in December 1980 and has been regularly shown on TV over the years. Erland was also featured in the 1987 Arnold Schwarzenegger film The Running Man, which was his last film appearance. He played Dynamo, a sadistic stalker who announces his presence by singing an aria from Mozart's Marriage of Figaro and electrocutes his victims. He once turned down a film role because he did not want to shave his head as he did for The Wanderers and Stir Crazy.

Personal life
Van Lidth De Jeude married Annette Friend on September 22, 1986, with whom he had one son, Christiaan. His brother Philip Van Lidth De Jeude, who was featured in the Dutch children's film Abeltje (released November 1998) as the Generalissimo, originally sang as a baritone and then as a dramatic tenor in both Europe and the United States, and sister Philine van Lidth de Jeude is a dramatic soprano and free-lance photographer.

He was born into the Dutch noble family Van Lidth De Jeude and held the predicate of untitled nobility Jonkheer (comparable to the archaic usage of the British Esquire and cognate to the German Junker).

Death
Van Lidth De Jeude died of heart failure on September 23, 1987 at age 34, a few months after finishing work on The Running Man and one day after his first wedding anniversary.

Wrestling career

Collegiate wrestling
National Collegiate Athletic Association
NCAA Division III Heavyweight - 6th place out of Massachusetts Institute of Technology (1975)
NCAA Division III Heavyweight - 2nd place out of Massachusetts Institute of Technology (1976)

Filmography

See also
 List of Dutch noble families

References

External links
 

1953 births
1987 deaths
American male film actors
20th-century American male opera singers
American male sport wrestlers
Dutch male film actors
MIT School of Engineering alumni
People from Hilversum
People from Ridgefield, Connecticut
Dutch emigrants to the United States
20th-century American male actors